Norma I. Quintana (born in Cleveland, Ohio) is a Puerto Rican American photographer and educator working in the tradition of social documentary. Quintana photographs with film, primarily in black and white using only available light. She is a founding member of the Bay Area nonprofit, Photo Alliance.

Education & early career 

Quintana graduated from Case Western University in her hometown of Cleveland, Ohio with a Master of Science in Social Administration in Juvenile Justice. In the 1980s Quintana moved to California from the Midwest and worked in Human Resources Management at Hewlett Packard.

Photography career 

Quintana began her career in documentary photography in the late 90s, attending Napa Valley College for a photography degree curriculum completed in 2001. She attended the Anderson Ranch Arts Center Photography Workshop with Shelby Lee Adams, and Maine Media Photography Workshop programs in Oaxaca, Mexico with both Mary Ellen Mark and Graciela Iturbide.

She has lectured nationally and internationally at major universities and completed residencies at Penn State and American University in Washington D.C. Exhibitions of her work have been displayed at the Zoller Gallery at Penn State, the Katzen Arts Center at the American University in Washington, D.C., Rayko Photo Center in San Francisco, San Francisco Camerawork and the California Museum of Photography.

Circus: A Traveling Life 

In 1999, Quintana found a flyer at a local cafe for an American one-ring circus created by James K. Judkins, former Carson & Barnes Circus manager. She requested and received permission from the performers to photograph them behind the scenes. Thus began a ten-year working relationship with the Circus Chimera. The material from a decade of collaboration with the circus went into Quintana's book, Circus: A Traveling Life, published in Fall 2014. The book was reviewed on Slate, CNN.com, the UK Guardian and Mother Jones. Curious Animal Magazine featured an image from the series, “Smoke” in their “Best Images of 2014”. A print feature appeared in B + W Magazines March 2015 issue and Quintana was invited to lecture about her Circus series at B&H Event Space in New York City

Forage From Fire 
On October 8, 2017 the Atlas Fire in Napa, California destroyed the artist's home and photography studio. This launched her new series Forage From Fire which documents the charred items she recovered from the ashes and shot completely on her iphone. The work was partially funded by a grant from the William & Flora Hewlett Foundation. A solo exhibition of the photographs and objects recovered from the fire was shown at SF Camerawork in October, 2018 and in group exhibitions at Sonoma Valley Museum of Art and UCR/California Museum of Photography. Quintana was interviewed by the BBC World Service on October 8, 2022 for The Cultural Frontline podcast.

Publications 

 Quintana, Norma I. (2014). Circus: A Traveling Life. .
 Douglas McCulloh (2020). Facing Fire: Art, Wildfire, and the End of Nature in the New West Inlandia Institute,

References

External links 
 Norma I. Quintana's website
 BBC World Service, The Cultural Frontline
 B&H lecture, December 2014.
 Circus: A Traveling Life
 Book trailer for Circus: A Traveling Life
 Outerfocus Podcast with Ian Weldon, May 2020.

American photographers
1954 births
Living people